The 2011 OEC Taipei Ladies Open was a professional tennis tournament played  on indoor carpet courts. It was the fourth edition of the  OEC Taipei Ladies Open, and part of the 2011 ITF Women's Circuit. It took place between 31 October and 6 November 2011 at the Taipei Arena in Taipei, Taiwan.

WTA entrants

Seeds

 1 Rankings are as of October 24, 2011.

Other entrants
The following players received wildcards into the singles main draw:
  Chan Chin-wei
  Hsu Wen-hsin
  Juan Ting-fei
  Lee Ya-hsuan

The following players received entry from the qualifying draw:
  Chan Wing-yau
  Kumiko Iijima
  Nudnida Luangnam
  Wang Qiang

Champions

Singles

 Ayumi Morita def.  Kimiko Date-Krumm, 6–2, 6–2

Doubles

 Chan Yung-jan /  Zheng Jie def.  Karolína Plíšková /  Kristýna Plíšková, 7–6(7–5), 5–7, [10–5]

External links
 
ITF Search

OEC Taipei Ladies Open
Hard court tennis tournaments
Tennis tournaments in Taiwan
Taipei WTA Ladies Open
2011 in Taiwanese tennis
2011 in Taiwanese women's sport